Clem Turner (1906 – death date unknown) was an American Negro league first baseman between 1926 and 1930.

A native of Arkansas, Turner made his Negro leagues debut in 1926 with the Kansas City Monarchs. He played for the Cleveland Tigers in 1928, and returned to Kansas City for his final season in 1930.

References

External links
 and Seamheads

1906 births
Date of birth missing
Year of death missing
Place of birth missing
Place of death missing
Cleveland Tigers (baseball) players
Kansas City Monarchs players
Baseball first basemen
Baseball players from Arkansas